Ashkelon Marina Breakwater Light  is a lighthouse in Ashkelon, Israel. It is located at the end of the main breakwater of the Ashkelon Marina. The site is accessible by walking the pier, but the tower is closed to the public.

See also

 List of lighthouses in Israel

References

 Listed as "Ashkelon (Ashqelon) Marina North Breakwater".

Lighthouses in Israel
Buildings and structures in Ashkelon